John Musinguzi Rujoki (born ), is a Ugandan mathematician and corporate executive who serves as the Commissioner-General of the Uganda Revenue Authority (URA), effective 2 April 2020.

Early life and education
Musinguzi was born in Rubirizi, Uganda circa 1973. After attending local primary school, he was admitted to Ntare School, a prestigious all-boys boarding high school in Mbarara city, where he obtained a High School Diploma. He was admitted to Makerere University, Uganda's oldest and largest public university, where he graduated with a Bachelor of Science degree in Mathematics. He went on to study at the University of Greenwich, in the United Kingdom, where he graduated with a Master of Science degree in  Computing and Information Systems.

Career
In 2000, Rujoki served as the head of the finance and audit department of the Special Revenue Protection Services (SRPS), a military unit attached to the Uganda Revenue Authority. The SRPS is credited with wiping out smuggling at Ugandan borders and especially on Lake Nalubaale.

In April he was appointed to lead at URA, as the new Commissioner General, replacing Doris Akol, who had served one year and five months of her second consecutive four-year contract. Within 60 days of his appointment four senior managers at URA resigned and the URA board "accepted" their resignations.

Other considerations
In addition to his other assignments, Rujoki serves as the Chairman of board of National Information Technology Authority (NITA-U), since October 2019. He is also a senior advisor on Information and Communications Technology (ICT) to the President of Uganda, since 2015. In his capacity as Commissioner General, he sits on the seven-person board of directors of the Uganda Revenue Authority, as his predecessors did.

References

Succession table at URA

External links
Website of Uganda Revenue Authority (URA)
Website of National Information Technology Authority (NITA-U)
Shs195 Billion (approx.US$55 million in 2017) Paint Deal Led To URA Shake-Up As at 1 June 2020.

1970s births
Year of birth uncertain
Living people
Ankole people
Ugandan businesspeople
Ugandan mathematicians
Makerere University alumni
Alumni of the University of Greenwich
People educated at Ntare School
Ugandan chief executives
People from Western Region, Uganda